Jungle Rumble: Freedom, Happiness, and Bananas is a 2014 independent video game developed and published by American indie studio Disco Pixel. The game is a crossover between a rhythm game and a real-time strategy video game in which the player drums on a mobile screen to control a tribe of monkeys.

Gameplay 

The game is played on a mobile device held vertically. The player drums on monkeys to control them, with different patterns for moving and attacking. Consistently moving builds "mojo" which increases the player's power. Enemy monkeys attack and the player must strategize to avoid being overrun.

The pattern tapped on the screen specifies the action and the objects tapped on specify what performs the action. The player continuously drums on things in the jungle in order to play the game. Designer Trevor Stricker has called this a "Rhythmic Grammar".

Reception 

The game has been praised for pushing the breadth and scope of rhythm games. Chief comparisons have been to Patapon and Rhythm Heaven. It has been criticized for difficulty. The game received generally positive reviews. 148 Apps praised the "goofy concept" in a 4/5 review. Apple'N'Apps cited the "unique experience" in a 9/10 review. Indie Gems called it an interesting mix of rhythm and RTS in a 9/10 review.

References

External links 
 

2014 video games
Android (operating system) games
Drumming video games
Indie video games
IOS games
Music video games
PlayStation Vita games
Puzzle video games
Real-time strategy video games
Video games developed in the United States